Sikhism in Bangladesh has an extensive heritage and history, although Sikhs had always been a minority community in Bengal. Their founder, Guru Nanak visited a number of places in Bengal in the early sixteenth century where he introduced Sikhism to locals and founded numerous establishments. In its early history, the Sikh gurus despatched their followers to propagate Sikh teachings in Bengal and issued hukamnamas to that region. Guru Tegh Bahadur lived in Bengal for two years, and his successor Guru Gobind Singh also visited the region. Sikhism in Bengal continued to exist during the colonial period as Sikhs found employment in the region, but it declined after the partition in 1947. Among the eighteen historical gurdwaras (Sikh places of worship) in Bangladesh, only five are extant. The Gurdwara Nanak Shahi of Dhaka is the principal and largest gurdwara in the country. The Sikh population in the country almost entirely consists of businessmen and government officials from the neighbouring Republic of India.

History 
Sikhism first emerged in Bengal when its founder, Guru Nanak, visited the Bengal Sultanate in 1504 during the reign of Sultan Alauddin Husain Shah. He passed through Kantanagar and Sylhet. Kahn Singh Nabha credits the establishment of Gurdwara Sahib Sylhet to Nanak himself. Mughal courtier Abu'l-Fazl ibn Mubarak also records in his Akbarnama that Nanak had entered Sylhet from Kamrup with his followers. He further narrates a story in which a faqir (Sufi ascetic) called Nur Shah transmorphed Nanak's senior companion Bhai Mardana into a lamb although Nanak was able to undo the spell later on. 

Nanak then sailed into Dhaka, where he stopped at the village of Shivpur and also visited Faridpur. He first preached to the potters of Rayer Bazaar, for whom he dug and consecrated a well in Jafarabad village for. Nanak was also said to have constructed a gurdwara in Jafarabad. The ruins of the well in Jafarabad is still visited by Sikhs, who believe that its waters have curative powers. Nanak then left Dhaka as he intended to travel to Calcutta and subsequently the Deccan. He passed through Chittagong, where he established a manji (religious headquarter) in Chawkbazar and made Bhai Jhanda its first masand. Raja Sudhir Sen of Chittagong converted to Sikhism as a result of his converted son, Indra Singh, and became a disciple of Guru Nanak. This manji later became the Chittagong Gurdwara (Joy Nagar Lane, Panchlaish) through the effort of Dewan Mohan Singh, the Bihari-Sikh dewan of the Nawab of Bengal Murshid Quli Khan. The Nawab had also allowed the entire property to be rent-free. The Dewan also established the Gurdwara of English Road in Dhaka which later collapsed.

Baba Gurditta later visited Bengal, where he established a manji in Shujatpur (presently the University of Dhaka campus) which Gurditta traced to be the location in which Nanak resided during his stay in Bengal. During the reign of Mughal emperor Jahangir, Guru Hargobind dispatched Bhai Nattha (Bhai Almast's successor) to Bengal, who dug another well and also laid the foundation stone for the Shujatpur Sikh Sangat, a religious congregation. The sangat commemorated the footsteps of Guru Nanak. 

Guru Tegh Bahadur stayed in Dhaka between 1666 and 1668 after visiting Assam. During this time, Bulaki Das was the masand (Sikh minister) of Dhaka. He established the Gurdwara Sangat Tola (14 Sreesh Das Lane) in Bangla Bazar. His wooden sandals are preserved at the Gurdwara Nanak Shahi. He also visited the Gurdwara Sahib Sylhet twice. His successor, Guru Gobind Singh, issued many hukamnamas to the Sylhet temple and also visited Dhaka. The Gurdwara Sahib Sylhet provided war elephants for him too.

Overtime, the Shujatpur sangat developed into what is now the Gurdwara Nanak Shahi from 1830 onwards. Under the initiative of Mahant Prem Daas, Bhai Nattha's well was reformed in 1833. A large number of Sikhs found employment with the Assam Bengal Railway and a gurdwara was established for them in Pahartali, Chittagong. The Gurdwara Sahib Sylhet was destroyed as result of the 1897 earthquake. The Sangat Sutrashashi at Urdu Road was later destroyed by the Sutra Sadhus. There is also a gurdwara in Banigram, Banshkhali.

In 1945, Sikhs established the Gurdwara Guru Nanak Sahib in Mymensingh which continues to be used by ten local families today. A Bengali Sikh called Here Singh was appointed as its inaugural chief. From 1915 to 1947, Sri Chandrajyoti served as the granthi of Gurdwara Nanak Shahi in Dhaka. After the Independence of Pakistan, most of the Sikh community left for the Dominion of India and the Dhaka gurdwara was looked after by Bhai Swaran Singh. After the Indo-Pakistani War of 1971 and Bangladesh Liberation War, Indian Sikh soldiers helped renovate the extant gurdwaras of Bangladesh including the Gurdwara Nanak Shahi.

Demographics
The Sikh population almost entirely consists of Punjabi businessmen and government officials from the neighbouring Republic of India. There exists a small ancient Balmiki community who retain fluency in the Punjabi language from the time of Guru Nanak. Despite the direct propagation from four of the Sikh gurus, the religion was unable to profoundly influence the Bengali people due to its seemingly Punjabi-centric nature.

Government recognition
The Government of Pakistan requisitioned this part of Jafarabad under Sikh supervision until 1959. A handwritten copy of the Guru Granth Sahib from the time of Guru Arjan was kept at the Gurdwara Sangat Tola and later moved to the Gurdwara Nanak Shahi in 1985. After the independence of Bangladesh, Bhai Kartar Singh and the Bangladesh Gurdwara Management Board seized control of all the gurdwaras in the country including the central Gurdwara Nanak Shahi of Dhaka.

References 

Religion in Bangladesh
Bangladesh